Kodalikaruppur is a village in the Udayarpalayam taluk of Ariyalur district, Tamil Nadu, India.

Demographics 

As per the 2001 census, Kodalikaruppur had a total population of 3339 with 1699 males and 1640 females.

References 

Villages in Ariyalur district